Leslie Norman or Les Norman is the name of:
 Leslie Norman (director) (1911–1993), British film director
 Les Norman (politician) (1913–1997), Australian politician
 Les Norman (baseball) (born 1969), former Major League Baseball outfielder
 Les Norman (lacrosse) (1935–2010), former professional lacrosse player

See also
 Norman (name)
 Norman Leslie (disambiguation)